Nicolae Tăbăcaru (born 20 August 1955) is a Moldovan politician, who served as foreign minister of Moldova from 28 July 1997 to 23 November 2000.

References

External links 
 15.03 - Chișinău: Interviu la Washington cu ministrul de externe Nicolae Tăbăcaru

1955 births
Living people
People from Odesa Oblast
Moldova State University alumni
Foreign ministers of Moldova
Ambassadors of Moldova to Germany
Ambassadors of Moldova to Sweden